Harry Elliott (2 November 1891 – 2 February 1976)  was an English cricketer who kept wicket for Derbyshire from 1920 to 1947 and for England between 1927 and 1934 and was an international Test umpire.

Elliot was born at Scarcliffe, Derbyshire and became a miner. He played cricket for his local club at Scarcliffe and later at Shirebrook where Derbyshire bowler Billy Bestwick was playing. In 1913 he obtained a job as a groom at Wiseton Hall in North Nottinghamshire, the home of Sir Joseph Laycock, where he looked after the cricket ground and played for Laycock's team. When World War I broke out he joined the artillery battery Laycock commanded, the 1/1st Nottinghamshire Royal Horse Artillery, and was sent to Egypt. After the war Archibald White was playing at Wiseton and was so impressed with Elliott that he sought to recruit him for Yorkshire. However the rule of birthplace prevented this, so he went instead to his native Derbyshire.

Elliott played his first first-class match for Derbyshire against Essex in June 1920. He quickly took over as wicketkeeper from George Beet. He continued playing for Derbyshire every year until 1939, and was a member of the team when the club won the County Championship in 1936. He played in four Tests for England which were against South Africa in 1927/8, against the West Indies in 1928 and twice against India in 1933/4. After the war he played a season for Derbyshire in 1947, sometimes together with his nephew Charlie Elliott. In his 532 first-class games, Elliott claimed 1206 victims - 903 caught, 303 stumped.

Elliott later became an umpire and officiated in seven Tests between 1950 and 1953. His nephew Charlie Elliott was also umpire from 1957 to 1974.

Elliott ran a sports outfitters at Derby where he died at the age of 85.

References

External links

1891 births
1976 deaths
England Test cricketers
English cricketers
Derbyshire cricketers
English Test cricket umpires
Marylebone Cricket Club cricketers
English cricketers of 1919 to 1945
People from Bolsover District
Cricketers from Derbyshire
People from Wiseton
Cricketers from Nottinghamshire
British Army personnel of World War I
Royal Horse Artillery soldiers
Wicket-keepers
Marylebone Cricket Club South African Touring Team cricketers
Military personnel from Derbyshire